The Estadio Único de Villa Mercedes, also known as Estadio La Pedrera, is a stadium located in Villa Mercedes, San Luis Province, Argentina. It was inaugurated on 8 July 2017 with a friendly match between the Friends of Martín Palermo and Friends of Fernando Cavenaghi combined teams. It has roofed grandstands and a parking lot. The stadium has a capacity of 28,000 spectators.

Overview 
The stadium is located on Parque La Pedrera, a park built by the Government of San Luis then leaded by Alberto Rodríguez Saá. Construction works were carried out by local companies Lumma, Rovella-Carranza, Green SA and Alquimaq. Apart from the stadium, autodrome (named "Carlos Bassi") was also built on the park. All at a total cost of AR$1,571,201,563. Estadio Único's facilities include an auxiliary field. The stadium occupies 20 of 66 ha. of the park.

The 2022 Trofeo de Campeones final between Boca Juniors and Racing Club de Avellaneda was held in Estadio Único.

Concerts 
The Estadio Único has hosted some concerts since its inauguration in 2017, such as:

Notes

References

External links 
 

u
2017 establishments
Buildings and structures in San Luis Province